Jane Elliott (born March 7, 1970) is an American dancer and choreographer for stage and film.

External links
 

American women choreographers
American choreographers
American female dancers
21st-century American dancers
Drama Desk Award winners
Modern dancers
1970 births
Living people
Place of birth missing (living people)
21st-century American women